is a railway station in Asahikawa, Hokkaido, Japan, operated by the Hokkaido Railway Company (JR Hokkaido).

Asahikawa Station is the central train station for the city of Asahikawa, which is the second largest city in Hokkaido by population after Sapporo.

Lines
The station is the terminus for the following JR Hokkaido lines. 
Hakodate Main Line
Sōya Main Line
Sekihoku Main Line (shin Asahikawa: terminus) 
Furano Line

The station is numbered "A28".

Station Layout
Asahikawa Station has 4 platforms serving 7 tracks. All platforms are located on the upper level above the concourse.

Adjacent stations

History

Asahikawa Station opened in 1898. With the privatization of Japanese National Railways (JNR) on 1 April 1987, the station came under the control of JR Hokkaido.

The first phase of a new elevated station building opened on 10 October 2010. The entire station complex was completed in autumn 2011

See also
 List of railway stations in Japan

References

External links

JR Hokkaido Asahikawa Station information 
Ekikara Time Table - Asahikawa Station 

Railway stations in Hokkaido Prefecture
Railway stations in Japan opened in 1898
Buildings and structures in Asahikawa